Catanele may refer to several villages in Romania:

 Catanele, a village in Căteasca Commune, Argeș County
 Catanele, a village in Gura Foii Commune, Dâmboviţa County
 Catanele, a village in Schitu Commune, Olt County
 Catanele Noi, a village in Catane Commune, Dolj County